The Krassel Ranger Station, near Yellow Pine, Idaho, was built in 1937. It was listed on the National Register of Historic Places in 1992.

It is located along the South Fork of the Salmon River, 11 miles west of Yellow Pine in the Payette National Forest.

Some of the work was designed by Architects of the United States Forest Service;  some of the building was done by the Civilian Conservation Corps.

It includes:
the Ranger's Residence, Building No. 1113 (1937), built with CCC labor
Building No. 1316 (1938), a warehouse/garage
a suspension footbridge (1941) across to the southern bank of the South Fork of the Salmon River.
Building No. 1204 (moved to site in 1954), formerly the warehouse and garage at the Poverty Flat Guard Station, moved here to be used as an office. Converted into a residence in 1990.
Building No. 1115, created by combination of:
CCC-constructed building (originally built in 1933) also moved from the Poverty Flat Guard Station in 1954, and
another structure (built in 1934) later moved from the Lake Fork Guard Station.

References

Ranger stations
Ranger stations in Idaho
National Register of Historic Places in Valley County, Idaho
Late 19th and Early 20th Century American Movements architecture
Buildings and structures completed in 1937